Enrique Hrabina (born 9 November 1961, in Argentina) is an Argentinean retired footballer.

References

Argentine people of Czech descent
Argentine footballers
Association football defenders
1961 births
Living people
Club Atlético Atlanta footballers
Boca Juniors footballers
San Lorenzo de Almagro footballers
Atlético Tucumán managers